Taşbaşı is a village in the central district of Hakkâri Province in Turkey. The village is populated by Kurds of the Mamxûran tribe and had a population of 684 in 2022.

The hamlet of İğdeli is attached to Taşbaşı.

History 
The village was attached to Çukurca District until 1993.

Population 
Population history from 2000 to 2022:

References 

Villages in Hakkâri District
Kurdish settlements in Hakkâri Province